Cane Hill is an unincorporated community in Cedar County, in the U.S. state of Missouri.

History
A post office called Cane Hill was established in 1858, and remained in operation until 1918. The community was named for the canebrake harvested near the town site.

References

Unincorporated communities in Cedar County, Missouri
Unincorporated communities in Missouri